Pontarddulais is a name of an electoral ward and parish of the City and County of Swansea, south Wales.  The parish of Pontarddulais has its own elected town council.

The electoral ward covers the town of Pontarddulais and its surrounding rural areas, in the parliamentary constituency of Gower.  The electoral ward is bounded by Mawr to the east; Llangyfelach to the south east; and Penyrheol to the south west.

For the 2012 local council elections, the turnout for Pontarddulais was 39.01%.  The results were:

References

External links
Pontarddulais statistics

Swansea electoral wards